Kubad may refer to:
 Kubad-e Moradi
 Kal Kubad

See also
 Kubadabad